Ferziger is a German language habitational surname. Notable people with the name include:
 Adam Ferziger (1964), American male writer
 Joel H. Ferziger (1937–2004), Computational fluid dynamicist

References 

German-language surnames
German toponymic surnames
Jewish surnames